Darlington Heights is an unincorporated community in Prince Edward County, Virginia, United States.

Notable residents 
Vernon Johns

References

Unincorporated communities in Virginia
Unincorporated communities in Prince Edward County, Virginia